Montecchio may refer to:
Montecchio
Montecchio Emilia
Montecchio Maggiore
Montecchio Precalcino
Montecchio, Peccioli

See also
Montecchio is also the medieval name of Treia.